Willie Clancy may refer to:

 Willie Clancy (musician) (1918–1973), Irish uilleann piper
 Willie Clancy (hurler) (1906–1967), Irish hurler

See also
William Clancy (disambiguation)